Abigail Wehrung (born 28 December 1995) is an Australian professional basketball player.

Career

WNBL
Wehrung began her professional career in 2014, for the Canberra Capitals. Wehrung was re-signed for the 2016–17 season, her third consecutive season with the Capitals. After strong showings throughout her 2016–17 season, Wehrung was re-signed for the 2017–18 season. Abbey is playing for Bendigo Spirit in the WNBL summer 2019 season.

In October 2020, Wehrung signed with the Adelaide Lightning for the 2020 season.

National Team

Youth Level
Wehrung made her international debut at the 2011 FIBA U16 Oceania Championship where she helped Australia take gold and qualify for the World Championship the following year. Wehrung represented Australia at the 2012 FIBA U17 World Championship in Amsterdam, Netherlands. Australia came in fifth place.

References

1995 births
Living people
Australian women's basketball players
Bendigo Spirit players
Canberra Capitals players
People from Daylesford, Victoria
Sportswomen from Victoria (Australia)
Universiade medalists in basketball
Universiade gold medalists for Australia
Guards (basketball)
Medalists at the 2017 Summer Universiade
Medalists at the 2019 Summer Universiade